Chorus Aviation is a Canadian holding company which owns regional airlines Jazz Aviation LP and Voyageur Airways as well as lessor Chorus Aviation Capital.

It was founded in 2006 as Jazz Air Income Fund, when then parent company ACE Aviation Holdings divested part of its interests in their regional airline business in an IPO. In 2008, ACE Aviation Holdings sold its remaining participation in the company. In 2011, it became a public corporation and changed its name to Chorus aviation, due to a change in Canadian tax laws which removed tax advantages for income funds, such changes prompting other income funds to restructure similarly.

In February 2011, Chorus reported that revenues had improved and that it had invested in the Uruguayan airline Pluna. After excessive losses, Pluna was shut down by the Uruguayan government on 5 July 2012, and Pluna's entire fleet was auctioned off on 1 October 2012.

Chorus aviation also acquired air charter company Voyageur Airways in 2015. Voyageur Airways provides chartered aircraft to the United Nations in support of various programmes in Africa.

On February 8, 2019, Chorus Aviation agreed to purchase nine CRJ900 regional jets from Bombardier in a deal valued at US$437 million. The aircraft will be operated by Chorus subsidiary, Jazz Aviation, with delivery expected in 2020.

In May 2022, it was announced Chorus has acquired the UK-based company, Falko Regional Aircraft Limited.

References

External links
 
 Jazz Air

Companies listed on the Toronto Stock Exchange
Air Canada
Airline holding companies of Canada
Companies based in Halifax, Nova Scotia
Canadian companies established in 2006
Holding companies established in 2006